Together is the first official album by the German progressive rock band, Jane, released in 1972.

Track listing
All songs are written by Klaus Hess, Charly Maucher, Werner Nadolny, Peter Panka and Bernd Pulst.

Side one
 "Daytime" - 8:10
 "Wind" - 4:57
 "Try to Find" - 5:27

Side two
 "Spain" - 11:57
 "Together" - 3:46
 "Hangman" - 9:30

Personnel
Klaus Hess – lead guitar
Charly Maucher – bass, vocals
Werner Nadolny – organ, flute
Peter Panka – drums, percussion
Bernd Pulst – vocals

References

1972 debut albums
Jane (German band) albums
Brain Records albums